Athelia may refer to:

 Athelia (disease), a congenital condition in humans where one or both nipples are absent
 Athelia (fungus), a genus of basidiomycete fungi in the family Atheliales
 not to be confused with Athaliah